Abies flinckii, commonly known as the Jalisco fir, is a species of conifer in the genus Abies. It is native to central Mexico and found along the Transmexican Volcanic Belt at altitudes between 2 km and 3.5 km above sea level.

References

 https://www.conifers.org/pi/Abies_hickelii.php
 https://www.gbif.org/species/2685510/metrics

External links

flinckii
Plants described in 1989
Trees of Mexico
Flora of the Trans-Mexican Volcanic Belt